Leopoldius signatus is a species of fly from the genus Leopoldius in the family Conopidae.

References 

Conopidae
Parasitic flies
Insects described in 1824
Muscomorph flies of Europe
Taxa named by Christian Rudolph Wilhelm Wiedemann